Cranham is a village in the English county of Gloucestershire. Forming part of the district of Stroud it is to be found a mile or so east of the A46 road between Stroud and Cheltenham. The Cotswold Way long-distance footpath also runs nearby.

Composer Gustav Holst lived in Cranham for a while, and it was there, in the house now called 'Midwinter Cottage' that he wrote what is probably the best known tune for the Christmas carol In the Bleak Midwinter by Christina Rossetti. A Ham class minesweeper, HMS Cranham, was also named after the village.

A Fairport Convention album, Gladys' Leap, is named after local postwoman Gladys Hillier, who would jump over a local stream to avoid a long journey. The Ordnance Survey have renamed that place in her honour.

In 1948, Cranham Scout Centre was opened by the chief scout of the time. Over 2000 people attended the celebration of the opening ceremony. Since then it has developed from a small campsite into an activity centre with indoor accommodation.

In 1949 George Orwell stayed at a sanatorium near the village, in his search for a relief if not a cure for the tuberculosis from which he was suffering and which would kill him six months later after his admission to University College Hospital.   While in the sanatorium he sketched out in 4 pages of a notebook a short story to be called A Smoking Room Story, set in Burma.  The story was never written.

In 2010, pop star Lily Allen bought Old Overton House, just outside Cranham, for a reported £3 million. Old Overton House is grade II listed with the earliest part of the property dating back to the seventeenth century.

References

External links 

Cranham in pictures
Village website
Scout Centre based in Village
GENUKI(tm) page
 Stroud Voices (Cranham filter) - oral history site

Villages in Gloucestershire
Stroud District
Civil parishes in Gloucestershire